= Norscot =

- Location within Gauteng Location within South Africa
- Coordinates: 26.038°S 28.007°E
- Country: South Africa
- Province: Gauteng
- Municipality: City of Johannesburg
- Main Place: Sandton

Area
  - Total: 0.80 km^{2} (0.31 sq mi)

Population (2011)
  - Total: 1,269
  - Density: 1,600/km^{2} (4,100/sq mi)

Racial makeup (2011)
  - Black African: 28.1%
  - Coloured: 0.9%
  - Indian/Asian: 3.7%
  - White: 67.3%

First languages (2011)
  - English: 72.8%
  - Zulu: 8.6%
  - Afrikaans: 7.5%
  - Tswana: 2.7%
  - Other: 8.4%
- Time zone: UTC+2 (SAST)
- Postal code (street): 2196
- PO box: 2055

Norscot is a suburb of Johannesburg, South Africa. It is located in Region E of the City of Johannesburg Metropolitan Municipality.
